Robert Charles Perrier (July 1, 1898 to April 19, 1987) was a French haute couture textile supplier, songwriter, socialite and art collector. His vintage silks rank among the world’s most coveted luxury fabrics, including exclusivities created for Coco Chanel, Christian Dior and Yves Saint Laurent, now exhibited at the Metropolitan Museum of Art, the Musée de la Mode et du Textile and the Victoria and Albert Museum. Perrier is further credited in history for having introduced synthetic fabrics to French haute couture, a major novelty at the time.

Perrier's family’s private artistic salon in Montmartre, dubbed R-26, was a bohemian gathering place for many creative luminaries of the 1930s to 1960s, including singer Josephine Baker, architect Le Corbusier and musician Django Reinhardt. He was the husband of lyricist Madeleine (Brault) Perrier and the father of journalist Marie-Jacques Perrier.

See also 
 Metropolitan Museum of Art
 Montmartre
 Musée de la Mode et du Textile
 Musée de Montmartre
 Musée Galliera
 Marie-Jacques Perrier
 R-26 (salon)
 Victoria and Albert Museum

References 

1898 births
1987 deaths
People of Montmartre